Le Ray may refer to:

Places:
 Le Ray, New York, U.S.
 Le Ray Township, Blue Earth County, Minnesota, U.S.

People:
 Dani Le Ray (born 1982), Australian gymnast
 Jacques-Donatien Le Ray (1726–1803), French "Father of the American Revolution"

See also 
 Leray, a surname